The Briones Formation is a Late/Upper Miocene epoch geologic formation of the East Bay region in the San Francisco Bay Area,  California.

It is found  in western Contra Costa County.

Geology 
The formation preserves fossils dating back to the Late/Upper Miocene epoch of the Neogene period. Common fossils in the area include Spisula, Calyptraeidae, Clinocardium, and S. falcata.  The presence of shell beds and mollusk fossils suggests the area was once under a shallow bay, with relatively uniform levels of salinity and sand porosity.  The shell beds form a conglomerate in a calcerous sandstone matrix; today, this conglomerate is a major component of notable geological features in the Bay Area, including Mission Peak. 

The base of the formation includes sandstone and siltstone in distinct, parallel layers.  The sandstone is unique in its relative coarseness and light coloration. Some areas also include a pebble conglomerate. 

The Tularcitos syncline is a significant geological feature in the southern part of the formation. The high level of deformation, compared to the northern area, suggests that there was significant metamorphic activity, enabling the formation of laumontite.

The vegetation present in the area is primarily annual grasses and forbs. The soil, which is primarily composed of sand, is considered "excessively drained" because of its high permeability and high levels of runoff. Today, the land is used primarily for grazing.

See also

 
 List of fossiliferous stratigraphic units in California
 Paleontology in California

References

Miocene California
Geology of Contra Costa County, California
Geologic formations of California
Messinian
Tortonian
Miocene Series of North America